PlayerAuctions is a digital marketplace that connects buyers and sellers of various types of gaming genre such as Massively multiplayer online game (MMO) games, First-person shooters (FPS), Multiplayer online battle arena (MOBA), Mobile game, survival games, battle royale game etc. so they can buy and sell digital assets. These include in-game currency (gold, coins, and cash shop currency), items, skins, accounts, power leveling and boosting services, and CD keys for games and applications. The site is a neutral marketplace that supports player-to-player trading for popular online games such as RuneScape, Old School RuneScape, World of Warcraft, CSGO, PUBG, Path of Exile, League of Legends, Fortnite, Overwatch, GTA V, Warframe, Pokémon Go, Clash of Clans, EverQuest, ArcheAge, Final Fantasy XIV, Apex Legends, Elder Scrolls Online, Habbo, Fallout 76, and over 250 other games.

Their international office locations: South Korea, Shanghai, Philippines and Hong Kong.

History 
PlayerAuctions emerged in November 1999 as an auction hosting platform for MMORPG players interested in digital asset trading. The buying and selling of in-game assets such as virtual currency is also a practice known as "real money trading" or RMT. On 1 April 2004, the site was purchased by IGE. In July 2007, PlayerAuctions was taken over by Korean digital asset exchange giant ItemMania. PlayerGuardian technology was introduced by way of a Public Beta in May 2008. The site was then officially relaunched in November 2008, continuing in their traditional focus on player-to-player trading only. PlayerAuctions now stands as a direct response to the auction house behemoth, eBay's decision to ban the trading of virtual goods.

PlayerGuardian and ItemMania 
PlayerAuctions does not directly aggregate or sell game assets.  Rather, PlayerAuctions lists items, assets, and accounts for sale from third-party sellers.  When a transaction occurs, PlayerAuctions holds both the payment and assets in escrow until delivery has been verified by the buyer, at which point the buyer's funds are released to the seller.  Using this system, which PlayerAuctions refers to as "PlayerGuardian," neither buyer nor seller shares personal information, and transactions are guaranteed.  The PlayerGuardian system was developed by Itemmania in the Korean market, where it has enabled more than 30 million transactions.

Player-to-Player Model 
Enabling direct transactions between MMO players is designed to cut down on the fraud and scams that have plagued the RMT market for years, and also to restrict the practice of "gold farming."  Gold farming involves the hiring of players solely for the purpose of collecting in-game currency and selling it on the open market.

PlayerAuctions Blog 
PlayerAuctions Blog is a PlayerAuctions affiliated blog which posts gaming news, guides, and editorial pieces. It was founded in 2014 and has a full-time staff of four in-house writers. Their most popular articles have accumulated tens of thousands of views and their stated mission is to bring a diverse cultural perspective to games blogging.

Controversy over secondary markets for MMOGs 
The RMT or secondary market for in-game MMOG assets has been controversial for a number of years, with many publishers forbidding the practice in their end-user license agreements (EULA).  However, current research estimates that approximately $1.4 billion (US) dollars of virtual goods are bought and sold by players around the world every year. Pro-RMT advocates argue that the secondary market increases the overall market by keeping "used" goods in circulation and bringing in new players, similar to secondary markets for autos and houses in the real world.

References

External links

Video game culture